Paschimi Star (Western Star) was a medal awarded to personnel of the Indian armed forces for participation on the western borders of India (on the ground, on the sea or in the air) during the Indo-Pakistani War of 1971.

The personnel included;
(a) All ranks of the Army, the Navy and the Air Force, of any of the Reserve Forces of the Territorial Army, J&K Militia and of any other armed forces of the Union of India;
(b) All ranks of the Railway Protection Force, Police Force, Home Guards, Civil Defence Organisation, and any other organisation specified by Government;
(c) Civilians of either sex serving regularly or temporarily under the orders/directions or supervision of the above-mentioned Forces.

Notable Recipients
 Field Marshal Sam Manekshaw
General Gopal Gurunath Bewoor
General K. V. Krishna Rao
Subedar Keshar Singh Rathore
RFN kunwarpal singh Raghav
Havaldar Chintaman V. Joshi
Havaldar Shankarsan Prasad Mishra
NK Pandurang D Harale
Havaldar Narotam Singh
Flt Sgt Krishnarao Jadhav
Subedar Prem Singh
Captain Bawa - Indian Navy Hero
Havaldar Pratap Singh
Nayab Subhedar Chintaman Joshi
Subedar Shuv Nath Sah

References

Military awards and decorations of India